Arısu (also, Arysu and Ayrysu) is a village in the Gadabay Rayon of Azerbaijan.  The village forms part of the municipality of Əlinağılar.

References 

Populated places in Gadabay District